Vulfpeck is an American funk band founded in 2011 in Ann Arbor, Michigan, by Jack Stratton, Theo Katzman, Woody Goss and Joe Dart. The band has released four extended plays, six studio albums and one live album through their own record label. The band gained recognition in 2014 for releasing Sleepify, a silent album that exposed a loophole in Spotify's royalty distribution and funded an admission-free tour. The band is one of the first to sell out Madison Square Garden without a manager or backing label, and released the recorded performance as a live album in 2019. The band's most recent album, Schvitz, was released in December 2022.

Background 

The band members attended University of Michigan's music school. They first came together for a recording session at the Duderstadt Center, a university facility that houses an arts library and other resources. After reading an interview with German producer Reinhold Mack, band founder Jack Stratton conceived of Vulfpeck as an imagined German version of the U.S. session musicians of the 1960s such as the Funk Brothers, the Wrecking Crew, and Muscle Shoals. The idea was to channel that era of the live rhythm section.

The band's founding members are Jack Stratton on keyboards, drums and guitar, Theo Katzman on guitar, drums and vocals, Woody Goss on keyboards, and Joe Dart on bass. Touring partners and frequent collaborators are Antwaun Stanley, Joey Dosik and Cory Wong. Other contributing musicians include Charles Jones, Christine Hucal, David T. Walker, Bernard Purdie, James Gadson and Blake Mills.

History

Early works and Sleepify
The band's first release was titled "Beastly". It was released in April 2011 as a YouTube video. The track was noted for its bass performance by No Treble, an online magazine for bass players. The band released its first EP, Mit Peck, in 2011 and a second EP, Vollmilch, in 2012. In 2013, three band members backed Darren Criss on his national tour, and Joe Dart was ranked as No Trebles 5th-favorite bassist. Vulfpeck's first live performance was at the Blind Pig in Ann Arbor, Michigan, followed by a performance in New York City at the Rockwood Music Hall in October 2013. The band released its third EP, My First Car, in August 2013. The EP features Antwaun Stanley on the band's first vocal track. A review of My First Car called it less energetic compared to the band's first two EPs but "still a fitting addition to a unique catalogue of music".

In March 2014, Vulfpeck released Sleepify, a ten-track silent album on Spotify, in order to raise funds for an admission-free tour. The album generated $20,000 in royalties over a two-month period. Subsequently, Spotify removed the album stating it violated their terms of content. The band's royalty generation scheme received international press coverage. In July the band received the royalties and soon after announced the Sleepify Tour.

In August 2014, the band released its fourth EP, Fugue State. The EP's second track "1612" is styled after Wardell Quezergue's works and features Antwaun Stanley on vocals. The song's title was inspired by the entrance code to an Airbnb Stratton was subletting. The admission-free Sleepify Tour took place in September 2014. Tour locations included San Francisco, Los Angeles, Chicago, Ann Arbor and New York City. In 2015, Stratton proposed a more equitable model for Spotify payout distribution in which each artist's payout is based solely on that artist's listeners, rather than every listener using the service.

Studio albums and Live at Madison Square Garden

Vulfpeck released Thrill of the Arts in October 2015. The album featured contributions by several artists including David T. Walker, Charles Jones and Blake Mills. Jim Fusilli of The Wall Street Journal called the music "gritty, in-your-face, not-prettified funk played with fire" and a homage to old-school funk and soul. The album debuted at number 16 on the U.S. R&B Albums chart. The band and Goodhertz Inc. released a production plug-in called Vulf Compressor. The band performed on The Late Show with Stephen Colbert in November 2015.

Vulfpeck's second album The Beautiful Game was released in October 2016. It featured contributions by several artists including Cory Wong and Adam Levy. The album debuted at number 10 on the Top R&B/Hip-Hop Albums chart. The band's third album, Mr Finish Line, was released in November 2017. It featured veteran instrumentalists James Gadson, Bootsy Collins, Michael Bland, David T. Walker, and vocalists Coco O., Antwaun Stanley, Joey Dosik, Christine Hucal, and Charles Jones. In 2016 and 2017 the band performed regularly with Antwaun Stanley and guest artists including several shows with Bernard Purdie and Ziggy Modeliste. The band performed a cover of "Boogie On Reggae Woman" on SiriusXM radio.

Vulfpeck's fourth album, Hill Climber, was released in December 2018 and featured Cory Wong, Joey Dosik, Antwaun Stanley, Ryan Lerman, Larry Goldings, Mike Viola, Monica Martin, and Louis Cole. In 2019, the Music Man guitar company introduced the Joe Dart Bass signature guitar, and subsequently the Joe Dart Jr. and Joe Dart II bass guitars. Dart was ranked first by Bass Guitar magazine as the coolest new bassist.

In September 2019, the band headlined a sold-out concert at Madison Square Garden, one of the first to do so without a manager or record label. Recording of the performance was released as a live album, titled Live at Madison Square Garden, along with a full concert film. The live performance featured touring partners Stanley, Wong, Dosik, and guest artists Charles Jones, Chris Thile, Dave Koz, Nate Smith, Mark Dover, Richie Rodriguez and others.

Vulf Vault and Schvitz
In August 2020, the band auctioned off the record space of the tenth track on their fifth album The Joy of Music, the Job of Real Estate to the New York City-based band Earthquake Lights. The album was released in October 2020. In 2020 the band started issuing compilation albums under the Vulf Vault heading. The first was an album of eight songs featuring Antwaun Stanley followed by an album of eleven songs written by Woody Goss. In 2021 the band issued vinyl-exclusive compilation albums highlighting the works of Katzman and Dart.

In January 2022 the band released an album of original recordings titled Vulf Vault 005: Wong's Cafe. Highlighting Cory Wong's work, produced by him and released on streaming under his name, the album includes contributions by Eddie Barbash. In August 2022, the band's label released an album of new recordings by Vulfmon (Jack Stratton's solo alias) titled Vulf Vault 006: Here We Go Jack, featuring contributions from David T. Walker, Monica Martin, Mike Viola and others.

In November 2022, Vulfpeck announced their return to music by revealing their sixth album Schvitz, which was released in December 2022. In an album review, Hunter-Tilney of Financial Times called the music "retro-funk and soul" and wrote the band "aims to put a smile on the listener's face".

 Style 

The band's production style is modeled after live TV performances of the past, such as The Midnight Special, The Old Grey Whistle Test, and Beat-Club. The band aims for a simple and minimal sound where each instrument contributes and does not dominate. Recordings are done live with real instruments, and seldom are different takes cut and mixed. Improvisation is a significant part of song development. The compositions are modeled after unconventional song structures of the past, such as "Ooh Child" with an A and B section where each section provides a lift, and "If You Want Me to Stay" with a repetitive eight bar progression.

 Side projects 
In 2018, Vulf Records released a six-track record by The Fearless Flyers, a quartet consisting of drummer Nate Smith, bassist Joe Dart, and guitarists Cory Wong and Mark Lettieri, with contributors Sandra Crouch, Blake Mills and Elizabeth Lea. In 2019, they issued their second six-track EP The Fearless Flyers II, featuring Chris Thile and Joey Dosik. Their debut full-length album Tailwinds was released in 2020, featuring a horn section consisting of saxophonists Grace Kelly, Kenni Holmen and Alekos Syropoulos. In 2021, the quartet released their recorded performance from supporting Vulfpeck at Madison Square Garden in 2019 in their first live album. Their third six-track EP The Fearless Flyers III was issued in 2022.

In 2019, band keyboardist Woody Goss released A Very Vulfy Christmas, a compilation of eight jazz-style rearrangements of Vulfpeck originals. The tracks feature drummer Dana Hall and bassists Matt Ulery and Joe Fee.

 Members 

 Joe Dart grew up in Harbor Springs, Michigan, and started on bass at age 8. He was influenced by Flea. In high school, he played in a Phish-inspired jam band. He names Pino Palladino, Rocco Prestia and Verdine White as his favorite bassists.
 Woody Goss grew up in Skokie, Illinois, and started on piano at age 7. He was influenced by Thelonious Monk and gravitated to jazz. He was later drawn to funk. In college, he gigged with several bands. In 2021, he released Rainbow Beach.
 Theo Katzman grew up on Long Island, New York. As a teenager, he played drums, guitar and wrote songs. In college, he was a member of My Dear Disco. His solo work is rock and folk based. In 2020, he released Modern Johnny Sings: Songs in the Age of Vibe.
 Jack Stratton grew up in Cleveland Heights, Ohio, and started on drums at an early age. He was influenced by Bernard Purdie and the Meters. In college, he led a band called Groove Spoon. He does most of Vulfpeck's management and production.Touring partners Joey Dosik – alto saxophone, keyboards, vocals (2016–present)
 Antwaun Stanley – vocals (2016–present)
 Cory Wong – guitar (2016–present)

 Tours 
 Sleepify Tour (2014)
 Spring Tour (2015)
 Wisdom of Crowds Tour (2017, 2018, 2019)

 Discography Chronological summary of original studio recordingsVulf Vault original recordings'

Notes

References

External links 
 
 
 
 Jack Stratton – Rolling Stone interview

American funk musical groups
American session musicians
Jam bands
Musical groups established in 2011
Musical groups from Michigan
Musical groups from Los Angeles
Culture of Ann Arbor, Michigan
2011 establishments in Michigan